Narma may refer to:

 Narma (tribe), located in Pakistan
 North American Reciprocal Museum Association, an association of arts, historical, and cultural institutions